The Chief Commissioner of Income Tax, or Director General of Income Tax is a senior rank in the Income Tax Department in India.

Appointment 
They are chosen from the Indian Revenue Service and typically serve the government for a period of 30 years.  After cadre restructuring, a new designation is created. The Principal Chief Commissioner of Income Tax and senior-most Chief Commissioners of Income Tax are promoted into this grade and have additional responsibilities as per personnel and budgetary targets are concerned.  Their equivalent rank at the Union Secretariat is that of a Special Secretary.

Duties 
Chief Commissioners are in charge of operations of the department within a region,  which is usually overlapping with the territory of a state.   Depending on the region, their numbers vary from 16 (in Maharashtra) to 3 (in Karnataka).  Chief Commissioners are allotted budgetary targets for collection by the Central Board of Direct Taxes and the targets are divided among the Commissioners of Income Tax and are constantly monitored.

Other Chief Commissioners
There are other Chief Commissioners who are not cadre controlling and are placed above the rank of Union Additional Secretary in the HAG plus scale.  The junior-most Chief Commissioners are now of the rank of Union Additional Secretary.  Thus, the Chief Commissioners of Income Tax draw three different pay scales based on their seniority.

References

See also
 Indian Revenue Service
Departmental Directory

Income Tax Department of India
Tax officials
Tax occupations